The New Zealand Breakers are a New Zealand professional basketball team based in Auckland, New Zealand, and play in the National Basketball League. The team was established in 2003, and they play most of their regular season games at Spark Arena.

The following is a list of all the players, both past and current, who have appeared in at least one game for the club.(Updated 15 September 2020)

2000s

Players

Coaching Staff

2010s

Players

Coaching Staff

2020s

Players

Coaching Staff

References

New Zealand Breakers
National Basketball League (Australia)
National Basketball League (Australia) all-time rosters